Capital Teas is an American specialty tea brand, based in Annapolis, MD, offering premium loose tea and tea-related products. Capital Teas was founded in 2007, and over the next decade grew its retail presence to eight states prior to closing its retail operations in August 2018. In October 2018, Anchor Beverages, Inc. took on the Capital Teas brand in online and wholesale channels. In the second half of 2022, Anchor Beverages plans to open several Capital Teas retail stores in select locations in Maryland, Virginia, and the District of Columbia.

History
From 2007 to 2014, Capital Teas was privately owned by co-founders Peter Martino and Manelle Martino who operated six street-front retail tea stores in Maryland, D.C., and Northern Virginia. In March 2014, Capital Teas received its first $5 million investment from Pear Tree Partners, based in Massachusetts, and began rapidly expanding the brand to 24 stores, with most expansion stores in large shopping malls in eight states. Subsequent investments through Pear Tree Partners made their investment funds the majority shareholders. After several years of success where Capital Teas, Inc. was named to the Inc. 5000 list of the fastest growing companies in America in 2016 and 2017, the rapidly changing retail environment resulted in the company closing many of its expansion stores due to declining foot traffic in shopping malls. By August 2018, the company closed its last store. In October 2018, Anchor Beverages, Inc., a new company started by Peter Martino, one of the original co-founders, took over operations of the Capital Teas brand as an e-Commerce company. In November 2022, the company expanded the Capital Teas presence again and opened a retail store in the Annapolis Mall. 

Capital Teas has been recognized as an innovator in the tea industry with products such as their tea and alcohol infusions including Tea Lager Beer Enhancers and Vino Teano Wine Mixers.

Products
The signature teas of the Capital Teas brand include Capital Breakfast, Annapolis Treasures, Chesapeake Sunrise, Turmeric Ginger, Island Mango, and Roasted Almond.  The majority of the teas sold under the Capital Teas brand are USDA-certified organic, and nearly all its teas contain only natural ingredients.

External links
 Brand Website
 Capital Teas Blog

References 

Companies based in Anne Arundel County, Maryland
American companies established in 2007
Tea brands in the United States